Radwańska is a surname. Notable people with the surname include:

 Agnieszka Radwańska (born 1989), Polish former tennis player 
 Urszula Radwańska (born 1990), Polish tennis player, younger sister of Agnieszka

See also
 Radwański (masculine form)

Polish-language surnames